KAGB (99.1 FM) is a radio station broadcasting a Hawaiian AC format simulcasting Hilo based KAPA. The station is licensed to Waimea, Hawaii, United States.  The station is currently owned by Pacific Radio Group, Inc.

References

External links

AGB
Radio stations established in 1994
1994 establishments in Hawaii